Fred Ernst Busbey (February 8, 1895 – February 11, 1966) was a U.S. Representative from Illinois.

Biography
Born in Tuscola, Illinois, Busbey attended the public schools, Armour Institute of Technology, Chicago, Illinois, and Northwestern University, Evanston, Illinois. During World War I he enlisted on September 24, 1917, in the United States Regular Army and served overseas as a sergeant until after the Armistice, when he was made a battalion sergeant major in the 124th Field Artillery, 33rd Infantry Division, being discharged June 8, 1919. In 1930 he engaged in the investment brokerage business in Chicago.

Busbey was elected as a Republican to the 78th Congress (January 3, 1943 – January 3, 1945). He was an unsuccessful candidate for reelection in 1944 to the 79th Congress.

Busbey was elected in 1946 to the 80th Congress (January 3, 1947 – January 3, 1949). He was an unsuccessful candidate for reelection in 1948 to the 81st Congress.

Busbey was elected to the 82nd and 83rd Congresses (January 3, 1951 – January 3, 1955). He was an unsuccessful candidate for reelection in 1954 to the 84th Congress. He resumed the investment brokerage business until his retirement in 1958. He resided in Cocoa Beach, Florida until his death there and was interred in Mount Hope Cemetery in Chicago.

See also
 List of members of the House Un-American Activities Committee

References
 Retrieved on 2008-04-14

1895 births
1966 deaths
Politicians from Chicago
United States Army personnel of World War I
United States Army soldiers
Republican Party members of the United States House of Representatives from Illinois
Florida Republicans
20th-century American politicians
People from Tuscola, Illinois